Baitul Jaamay Mosque is an Ahmadi Muslim mosque in Glen Ellyn, DuPage County, in the US state of Illinois.

References

Ahmadiyya mosques in the United States
Glen Ellyn, Illinois
Mosques completed in 2003
Mosques in Illinois